Det Vilde Kor is the third full-length album by the Norwegian folk metal band Lumsk. It was released on February 26, 2007 by Tabu Recordings. The lyrics are taken from Knut Hamsun's similarly titled poetry collection of 1904.

Track listing
 "Diset Kvæld" – 3:04
 "Om Hundrede Aar er Alting glemt" – 6:31
 "Høstnat" – 3:38
 "Paa Hvælvet" – 2:50
 "Lad Spille med Vaar over Jorden" – 3:22
 "Duttens Vise" – 3:22
 "Svend Herlufsens Ord, del I Min Kærest er som den" – 2:37
 "Svend Herlufsens Ord, del II Og du vil vide" – 2:23
 "Svend Herlufsens Ord, del III Jeg har det" – 1:50
 "Svend Herlufsens Ord, del IV Se, Natten er Livet" – 4:35
 "Godnat Herinde" – 3:29
 "Skærgaardsø" – 2:45

Personnel
Stine Mari Langstrand – Vocals
Vidar Berg – Drums
Ketil Sæther – Guitar
Espen Warankov Godø – Piano, Hammond, Synthesizer
Eystein Garberg – Guitar
Siv Lena Waterloo Laugtug – Violin
Espen Hammer – Bass Guitar

Footnotes

2007 albums
Lumsk albums
Knut Hamsun